Leandro Isaac Maciel (born 29 December 1995) is an Argentine professional footballer who plays as a midfielder for Aldosivi.

Career
Maciel began his career with Argentine Primera División side Lanús, featuring for the club's U20s at the 2016 U-20 Copa Libertadores where he scored and was sent off as Lanús finished fourth. He made his professional debut for the first-team during their final league fixture of 2016, playing the last twenty-two minutes of a 1–3 defeat to Huracán on 22 May. His first senior goal came in a 1–5 defeat to River Plate on 28 December 2018. In June 2019, Maciel was loaned to Aldosivi for the 2019–20 season. After seventeen appearances in all competitions, Maciel was signed permanently by Aldosivi in August 2020.

Career statistics
.

Honours
Lanús
Argentine Primera División: 2016

References

External links

1995 births
Living people
Footballers from Rosario, Santa Fe
Argentine footballers
Association football midfielders
Argentine Primera División players
Club Atlético Lanús footballers
Aldosivi footballers